Peter Sprung (born July 20, 1979) is a German footballer who currently plays for Sportfreunde Seligenstadt.

External links

1979 births
Living people
German footballers
German people of Polish descent
Eintracht Frankfurt II players
Stuttgarter Kickers players
3. Liga players
Association football forwards